Shilovka is a rural locality (a village) in Yugskoye Rural Settlement, Cherepovetsky District, Vologda Oblast, Russia. The population was 13 as of 2010.

Geography 
The distance to Cherepovets is 57 km, to Novoye Domozerovo is 24 km. Musora is the nearest rural locality.

References 

Rural localities in Cherepovetsky District